Brian Leauma (born 11 July 1978) is a Samoan former professional rugby league and rugby union footballer who represented Samoa in rugby league at the 2000 World Cup.

Playing career
Leauma attended Lithgow High in Lithgow, New South Wales. In 1995 and 1996 he played for the Australian Schoolboy's.

In 1997 Leauma played for the Junior Kiwis.

In 1998 Leauma played one National Rugby League game for the Penrith Panthers.

He was named in the Samoan squad for the 2000 World Cup, and played in all four matches for Samoa.

In 2001 Leauma switched to rugby union, and played for the New South Wales Waratahs.

References

1978 births
Living people
Australian sportspeople of Samoan descent
Australian people of New Zealand descent
Australian rugby league players
Australian rugby union players
Junior Kiwis players
Samoa national rugby league team players
Penrith Panthers players
Samoan rugby league players
Samoan rugby union players
New South Wales Waratahs players
Rugby league wingers